Bill Taylor (born June 10, 1956 in St. Louis) is an American former alpine skier who competed in the men's slalom at the 1980 Winter Olympics.

External links
 sports-reference.com
 

1956 births
Living people
American male alpine skiers
Olympic alpine skiers of the United States
Alpine skiers at the 1980 Winter Olympics
Sportspeople from St. Louis
20th-century American people